Alfred Payne (7 December 1831 – 25 June 1874) was an English amateur cricketer who played first-class cricket from 1852 to 1864.  He was the twin brother of Arthur Payne.

Payne was a student at Trinity College, Oxford, matriculating in 1851 and graduating B.A. in 1856. He played cricket mainly for Oxford University and Marylebone Cricket Club (MCC), he made 25 known appearances in first-class matches.  He played six times for the Gentlemen in the Gentlemen v Players series.

Payne was a left arm fast bowler (LF) who bowled roundarm.  He took 111 wickets at 12.19 with a best analysis of 7/42.  He took five wickets in an innings 8 times and ten wickets in a match once.

After graduating at Oxford, Payne became a Church of England priest and was rector of Enville, Staffordshire, from 1869 until his death.

References

1831 births
1874 deaths
English cricketers
English cricketers of 1826 to 1863
Marylebone Cricket Club cricketers
Gentlemen cricketers
Oxford University cricketers
Twin sportspeople
English twins
Gentlemen of England cricketers
Alumni of Trinity College, Oxford
19th-century English Anglican priests
North v South cricketers